Huge is a studio album by Hugh Hopper and Kramer, released on June 17, 1997 by Shimmy Disc and Knitting Factory Records.

Track listing

Personnel 
Adapted from Huge liner notes.

Musicians
Hugh Hopper – bass guitar, piano
Kramer – guitar, piano, organ, tape, production, mastering, engineering
Damon Krukowski – drums, percussion
Additional musicians
Micaël Gidon – vocals and guitar ("Only Being")
Robert Jarvis – trombone (9)

Production and additional personnel
 Alan Douches – mastering
 Yalitza Ferreras – design
 Michael Macioce – photography
 Steve Watson – assistant producer, assistant engineer

Release history

References

External links 
 

1997 albums
Collaborative albums
Albums produced by Kramer (musician)
Hugh Hopper albums
Kramer (musician) albums
Knitting Factory Records albums
Shimmy Disc albums